The 1938–39 Georgetown Hoyas men's basketball team represented Georgetown University during the 1938–39 NCAA college basketball season. Elmer Ripley, who had coached Georgetown previously from 1927 to 1929, returned for his second of three stints as head coach; it was his third season overall as the Hoyas head coach. The team was a member of the Eastern Intercollegiate Conference (EIC) and played its home games at Tech Gymnasium on the campus of McKinley Technical High School in Washington, D.C. The team finished as conference co-champion, with a record of 6-4 in the EIC and 13-9 overall. It had no postseason play.

Season recap

Senior forward Joe Murphy was the teams star. He scored in double figures in nine games, including 14 points against Syracuse, 11 against Maryland, and 15 against EIC rival Penn State. He finished the season averaging a career-high 8.9 points per game. Over his career, he was the second-highest scoring Georgetown player of the 1930s and fifth-highest in school history at the time. He had scored in double figures in 17 of the 65 games of his three-year college varsity career.

Junior forward John Schmitt scored 12 points in an upset of West Virginia in an EIC game. His season ended when he broke his leg during the game at Yale.

Georgetown finished with an overall record of 13-9, the most wins by a Georgetown team since the 1929-30 season and the best winning percentage since 1928-29. The school had been a founding member of the EIC when the conference began play in the 1932-33 season, and this years 6-4 conference record gave the school its first and only regular-season EIC championship – Georgetowns first championship of any kind – which it shared with Carnegie Tech. Although the EIC never held a postseason conference tournament, in previous seasons when the regular season had ended in a first-place tie it had held a single postseason playoff game between the two first-place teams to determine the conference championship. This season, however, no such playoff game took place, and Georgetown and Carnegie Tech settled for the only co-championship in EIC history.

Although the Associated Press described the Eastern Intercollegiate Conference as "one of the best in the nation," its members agreed to disband it at the end of the season because geographical problems had made scheduling difficult. Georgetowns overall conference record during its seven-year membership was 27-39.

At the end of the season, Georgetown thus became an independent again for the first time since the 1931-32 season. In 1939-40, the Hoyas would play their first of 38 seasons as an independent before becoming a founding member of the original Big East Conference in the 1979-1980 season.

Roster
Sources

Junior guard Francis "Reds" Daly was killed in action in the Battle of Iwo Jima on February 22, 1945, during World War II military service.

1938–39 schedule and results
Sources

|-
!colspan=9 style="background:#002147; color:#8D817B;"| Regular Season

References

Georgetown Hoyas men's basketball seasons
Georgetown Hoyas
Georgetown Hoyas men's basketball team
Georgetown Hoyas men's basketball team